Hedley Blackmore (30 January 1901 – 22 August 1992) was a former Australian rules footballer who played with Carlton in the Victorian Football League (VFL).

Notes

External links 

Hedley Blackmore's profile at Blueseum

1901 births
1992 deaths
Australian rules footballers from Victoria (Australia)
Australian Rules footballers: place kick exponents
Carlton Football Club players
Maryborough Football Club players
Brunswick Football Club players